Neil "Norrie" Martin (7 May 1939 – 10 October 2013) was a Scottish footballer best known for playing for Rangers. He was a goalkeeper.

Football career
Born in Fife but raised in Ayrshire, Martin started his career at Junior side Dalry Thistle and joined Hamilton Academical in 1957 but after a few months he moved back to Dalry.

A year later he joined Rangers, but had poor luck with injuries and became the understudy to Billy Ritchie at Ibrox. He managed to make 75 league appearances for the club over 12 years, 115 in total. his most active seasons were 1966–67 in which he played in the finals of the Scottish League Cup and the European Cup Winners' Cup, and 1968–69 when he took part in the Scottish Cup Final, however Rangers lost to Celtic on both domestic occasions and to Bayern Munich in the continental event.

Martin left Rangers to join East Fife in 1970 but only made two league appearances before leaving to join Queen of the South a few months later. In Dumfries he made four league appearances and then re-joined Hamilton for the rest of the 1970-71 season.

Post playing career
Upon retirement, Martin took over the family business - his father owned a hotel in Prestwick. Martin died on 10 October 2013 at his home in Prestwick after a short battle with lung cancer.

References 

Scottish footballers
Hamilton Academical F.C. players
Rangers F.C. players
East Fife F.C. players
Queen of the South F.C. players
Association football goalkeepers
Dalry Thistle F.C. players
Scottish Football League players
1939 births
2013 deaths
People from Prestwick
Footballers from South Ayrshire
Footballers from Fife
Scottish Junior Football Association players